Mount Huangbo is a mountain in Fuqing county of Fujian Province, in the East China region of the People's Republic of China.  

The mountain is famous for its Buddhist temples, including Wanfu Temple (home of Yinyuan Longqi, founder of the Japanese Ōbaku Zen sect).

See also
Mountains of China

Huangbo
Tourist attractions in Fuzhou
Fuzhou